Righteous Love is a 2014 South Korean television series starring Uhm Tae-woong, Lee Si-young and Lee Soo-hyuk. It aired on tvN at 23:00 (KST) time slot from December 1, 2014 to February 3, 2015 for 20 episodes.

Synopsis
Jang Hee-tae (Uhm Tae-woong) and Kim Il-ri (Lee Si-young) first met thirteen years ago when Hee-tae was a substitute biology teacher at an all-girls high school where Il-ri was a student. She had a huge crush on him, and though inappropriate, he started having feelings for her too. But when Il-ri is left seriously injured after a car accident in which she tried to save him, Hee-tae resigns from the school. Seven years later, they meet again by chance, fall in love, then get married and have a typical, happy marriage.

Now a marine researcher on fishery, Hee-tae one day discovers that his wife is contemplating having an affair. Il-ri, who has only loved and slept with one man her entire life, finds herself strongly attracted to a carpenter she works with, Kim Joon (Lee Soo-hyuk), while Hee-tae gets furious for the first time in his life. He spies on his wife.

Cast
 Uhm Tae-woong as Jang Hee-tae - A Marine biologist husband of Kim Il-ri who was her professor back in highschool. He first suspected his wife was having an affair by receiving a message from an anonymous number. After confirming the suspicion and throwing a fit, he filed a divorce petition and started living separately. Another problem arise in their family causing the two of them to stay together which made things difficult. But after having his thoughts collected, and realized that he still love her wife he decided to get back with Il-ri but this time Il-ri refused telling him how her feeling were hurt when he did not listen and forgave her when she was pleading.
 Lee Si-young as Kim Il-ri - A hard-laborer who only finished her high school, Il-ri married her high school sub-professor Jang Hee-tae after they met again after 7 years. However, as soon as they got back from their honeymoon vacation, Hee-tae's sister collapsed which gave her the decision to not have any baby and treat Hee-soo as her baby as Hee-soo's body paralyzed. When she accepted a part-time work from her co-worker, she met carpenter Kim, whom she find herself attracted to. The two of them found mutual feelings but is later discovered by her husband causing a crack in their perfect marriage and filed a divorce. But after different trials in their family, she decided to leave carpenter Kim and got back together with Hee-tae.
 Lee Soo-hyuk as Kim Joon - Found by his grandfather at his doorstep, Kim Joon grew up following his grandfather's footsteps by becoming a carpenter. He hired someone to be the painter for his new studio and did not expect it to be a girl. At first being cold and grouchy with Il-ri and her chattering, he later fell in love with her even with the knowledge of Il-ri being married.
 Choi Yeo-jin as Jang Hee-soo - Hee-tae's sister who was once a ballerina but because of her collapsing and becoming a paralyzed person, she only observed around her family, often imagining herself having conversations with her family. 
 Lee Young-lan as Mrs. Go
 Im Ha-ryong as Jang Min-ho
 Park Jeong-min as Jang Ki-tae
 Seo Jeong-yeon as Kim Boon-ja
 Han Eu-ddeum as Kim Yi-ri
 Ryu Hye-rin as Jung Soo-young
 Han Do-woo as Choi Duk-bae
 Han Soo-yeon as Yoo Sun-joo 
 Kim Ki-moo as Hwang Jung-goo
 Han Seung-yoon as Lee Suk
 Kim Sung-ki as Mart Grandpa
 Seo Tae-hwa as Professor Park 
 Hong Tae-ui as Park Min-ki
 Jin Hee-kyung as Kim Joon's mother
 Park Jin-seo
 Hwang Gun
 Gong Hyung-jin (cameo)
 Lee Si-eon (cameo)
 Sung Ji-ru (cameo)

International broadcast
 It aired in Vietnam on VTV3 from August 25, 2016.
 It aired in Malaysia on TV9 (Malaysia) started December 2017.

References

External links
  
 
 

2014 South Korean television series debuts
2015 South Korean television series endings
TVN (South Korean TV channel) television dramas
South Korean romantic comedy television series